Vértice (Spanish: Vertex) was a monthly Falangist magazine published in San Sebastián, Spain, between 1937 and 1946. Its subtitle was Revista nacional de la Falange. From late 1937 it was changed to Revista nacional de Falange Española Tradicionalista y de las J.O.N.S. The magazine was one of the early propaganda publications which supported the rule of Francisco Franco.

History and profile
Vértice was started in San Sebastian in April 1937 during the Civil War and came out monthly. It was affiliated with the FET y de las JONS, also known as the Falange. Its publisher was Nueva Editorial S.A. The magazine had a large format, 355×280mm.

Some of the contributors were Federico de Urrutia, Dionisio Ridruejo, Carmen de Icaza, Martín Almagro Gorbea, José María Usandizaga and Benito Perojo. Surrealist painter José Caballero also contributed to Vértice. From April 1938 Manuel Halcón became its director and Tono or Antonio Lara de Gavilán its artistic director. The latter held the post until December 1938 when Miguel Mihura began to work as its artistic director. Halcón edited the magazine until April 1939 and was replaced by Samuel Ros as director. José María Alfaro succeeded Ros in the post. The headquarters of the magazine moved to Madrid in December 1939. The last issue was no.83 published in 1946.

References

External links

1937 establishments in Spain
1946 disestablishments in Spain
Defunct political magazines published in Spain
Fascist newspapers and magazines
Former state media
Magazines established in 1937
Magazines disestablished in 1946
Magazines published in Madrid
Monthly magazines published in Spain
Spanish-language magazines
Mass media in San Sebastián
Propaganda newspapers and magazines
FET y de las JONS